Scholars have suggested different theories for the origin of the name Kurd. According to the English Orientalist Godfrey Rolles Driver, the term Kurd is related to the Sumerian Karda which was found from Sumerian clay tablets of the third millennium B.C, while according to other scholars, it predates the Islamic period, as a Middle Persian word for "nomad", and may ultimately be derived from an ancient toponym or tribal name, either that of the Cyrtii or of Corduene.

Name
There are different theories about the origin of the name Kurd. According to one theory, it originates in Middle Persian as 𐭪𐭥𐭫𐭲 kwrt-, a term for "nomad; tent-dweller".
After the Muslim conquest of Persia, this term is adopted into Arabic as kurd, and was used specifically of nomadic tribes.

From the 7th century onwards, the name Kurd is better known, since the Arabs used it often (al Akrad).   

According to some sources, by the 16th century, there seems to develop an ethnic identity designated by the term Kurd among various Northwestern Iranian groups, without reference to any specific Iranian language.

Sherefxan Bidlisi in the 16th century states that there are four division of "Kurds": Kurmanj, Lur, Kalhor and Guran, each of which speak a different dialect or language variation. Paul (2008) notes that the 16th-century usage of the term Kurd as recorded by Bidlisi, regardless of linguistic grouping, might still reflect an incipient Northwestern Iranian "Kurdish" ethnic identity uniting the Kurmanj, Kalhor, and Guran.

Ethnogenesis
The term kurd is used in the 16th century by Sherefxan Bidlisi as encompassing four tribal groups,  the Kurmanj, Lur, Kalhor and Guran, each of which speak a different dialect or language variation. Paul (2008) argues that this marks an incipient ethnogenesis of the Kurds as a coherent Northwestern Iranian group, as three out of these four groups can be identified as the ancestors of groups that at least partially identify as Kurdish today, while the Lurs are not a Kurdish group, and indeed do not belong to the Northwest Iranian but to the Southwestern Iranian linguistic phylum. Paul further notes that the first texts that identifiably are written in Kurdish appear during the same period.

Predecessor groups

The Kurdish people are believed to be of heterogeneous origins combining a number of earlier tribal or ethnic groups 
including Lullubi, Guti, Cyrtians, Carduchi.

Some of them have also absorbed some elements from Semitic, Turkic and Armenian people.

Kurds are an Iranian people, and the first known Indo-Iranians in the region were the Mitanni, who established a kingdom in northern Syria five centuries after the fall of Gutium. The Mitanni are believed to have spoken an Indo-Aryan language, or perhaps a pre-split Indo-Iranian language. Little is known of the origins, material culture or language of the Guti, as contemporary sources provide few details and no artifacts have been positively identified. As the Gutian language lacks a text corpus, apart from some proper names, its similarities to other languages are impossible to verify. The names of Gutian-Sumerian kings suggest that the language was not closely related to any languages of the region, including Sumerian, Akkadian, Hurrian, Hittite, and Elamite.

19th-century scholars, such as George Rawlinson, identified Corduene and Carduchi with the modern Kurds, considering that Carduchi was the ancient lexical equivalent of "Kurdistan". This view is supported by some recent academic sources which have considered Corduene as proto-Kurdish or as equivalent to modern-day Kurdistan. Some modern scholars, however, reject a Kurdish connection to the Carduchi.

There were numerous forms of this name, partly due to the difficulty of representing kh in Latin. The spelling Karduchoi is itself probably borrowed from Armenian, since the termination -choi represents the Armenian language plural suffix -kh. It is speculated that Carduchi spoke an Old Iranian language. They also seem to have had Armenian elements. 

A legend recorded by Judaic scholars claimed that the people of Corduene had supernatural origins, when  King Solomon arranged the marriage of 500 Jewish women to jinns (genies). The same legend was also used by early Islamic authorities, in explaining the origins of the Kurds.

The Medes have often been believed to be a starting point for Kurdish ethnogesis. This would leave about a millennium of separate development between the collapse of the Median Empire and the first historical mention of the Kurds as an identifiable ethnic group.

The Median hypothesis was advanced by Vladimir Minorsky. Minorsky's view was subsequently accepted by many Kurdish nationalists in the 20th century. I. Gershevitch provided "a piece of linguistic confirmation" of Minorsky's identification and then another "sociolinguistic" argument. Gernot Windfuhr (1975) identified Kurdish dialects as Parthian, albeit with a Median substratum. The hypothesis of having Median ancestors is rejected by Martin van Bruinessen. Bruinessen states: "Though some Kurdish intellectuals claim that their people are descended from the Medes, there is not enough evidence to permit such connection across the considerable gap in time between the political dominance of the Medes, and the first attestation of the Kurds. Garnik Asatrian (2009) stated that "The Central Iranian dialects, and primarily those of the Kashan area in the first place, as well as the Azari dialects (otherwise called Southern Tati) are probably the only Iranian dialects, which can pretend to be the direct offshoots of Median ... In general, the relationship between Kurdish and Median are not closer than the affinities between the latter and other North Western dialects — Baluchi, Talishi, South Caspian, Zaza, Gurani, etc."

Origin legends

There are multiple legends that detail the origins of the Kurds. One of the 10th century by the Arab Al-Masudi details the Kurds as being the offspring of King Solomon’s concubines engendered by the demon Jasad. On learning who they were, Solomon shall have exclaimed "Drive them (ukrudūhunna) in the mountains and valleys" which then suggests a negative connotation such as the "thrown away". Another that they are the descentents of King Solomons's concubines and his angelical servants. These were sent to Europe to bring him five-hundred beautiful maidens, for the king's harem. However, when these had done so and returned to Israel the king had already died. As such, the Djinn settled in the mountains, married the women themselves, and their offspring came to be known as the Kurds.

Additionally, in the legend of Newroz, an evil king named Zahak, who had two snakes growing out of his shoulders, had conquered Iran, and terrorized its subjects; demanding daily sacrifices in the form of young men's brains. Unknowingly to Zahak, the cooks of the palace saved one of the men, and mixed the brains of the other with those of a sheep. The men that were saved were told to flee to the mountains. Hereafter, Kaveh the Blacksmith, who had already lost several of his children to Zahak, trained the men in the mountains, and stormed Zahak's palace, severing the heads of the snakes and killing the tyrannical king. Kaveh was instilled as the new king, and his followers formed the beginning of the Kurdish people.

In the writings of the Ottoman Turkish traveller Evliya Çelebi, there's also a legend concerning the Kurds to be found. He states to have learned of this legend from a certain Mighdisî, an Armenian historian:

See also
History of the Kurds
Medes
Cyrtians
Corduene
Jinn

Notes

References

Kurds
Origin